The Federation of Norwegian Professional Associations is a national trade union center in Norway. It was formed in October, 1997 as a break-away union from the Academic and Professional Unions (AF).

Akademikerne has a membership of 231,062.

Affiliates
The following unions were affiliated to the federation as of 2021:

Cooperating Unions
Several unions cooperate with Akademikerne when negotiating on a state or municipal level:
 Norwegian Society of Engineers and Technologists
 The Norwegian Association of Pharmacists
 Den Norske Jordmorforening

References

External links
 

Trade unions in Norway
Breakaway trade unions
Trade unions established in 1997